We Shine is Fee's first major label studio album, released on September 25, 2007 through INO Records. Their song "All Because of Jesus" was the lead single from this album, peaking at No. 4 on Billboard's Christian Songs chart, and was covered by Casting Crowns for their album The Altar and the Door.

Track listing

Chart positions

Awards

In 2008, the album was nominated for a Dove Award for Special Event Album of the Year at the 39th GMA Dove Awards.

References

Fee (band) albums
2007 albums